The Porter from Maxim's (French: Le chasseur de chez Maxim's) is a 1939 French comedy film directed by Maurice Cammage and starring Bach, Roger Tréville and Geneviève Callix. It is based on the 1923 play of the same name which has been made into several film adaptations.

Cast

References

Bibliography
 Rearick, Charles. Paris Dreams, Paris Memories: The City and Its Mystique. Stanford University Press, 2011.

External links 
 

1939 films
French comedy films
1930s French-language films
1939 comedy films
Films directed by Maurice Cammage
Films set in Paris
French films based on plays
Films scored by Casimir Oberfeld
Remakes of French films
French black-and-white films
1930s French films